Thorsten Zwinger (artist pseudonym ZWINGER, born March 23, 1962 in Greifswald) is a German painter.

Work 

Thorsten Zwinger works on the assumptions of an image survey, which pursues three media basics: 1. As a painter, he operates in a structurally designed character system, which is intended to switch off historically loaded attachments to terms such as abstraction, concreteness, narration, illusionism, pop art, concept, realism. The 2. line is complementary to painting. Zwinger photographes as others would draw. Both basics cross correspondingly above the endpoints of visibility: resolution (painting) and concretion (photography). The 3. line attempts to transfer the problem between image and perception into the spatial. The sculptures of blown glass volumes, or of alienated packaging, which are designed as objects, are to investigate the phenomenon of appearance.

He lives in Greifswald and Berlin. He is an ancestor of Eugen Zwinger.

Individual exhibitions (selection)  
 2016: Palmers Pausen, Gallery Werner Tammen, Berlin
 2014: New Works, Gallery Werner Tammen, Berlin
 2009: Lichtsmoke, Gallery Werner Tammen, Berlin 
 2007: Kabuff N.K.23, Howard Scott Gallery, New York
 2006: Kabuff N.K.23, Gallery Werner Tammen, Checkpoint Charlie, Berlin
 2002: Bruch und Übergang / Rupture and Transition, Gallery Werner Tammen,  Berlin
 2002: Black Paintings / The Same Things That Make You Live Will Kill You, Gallery Paul Veron, Greifswald
1995: Die Stadt als Interieur, museum of the hanse town Greifswald, today Pommersches Landesmuseum, Greifswald
1994: Works on paper, Holly Affinity Galerie, Taipei City, Taiwan (R.O.C.), 1994

Exhibitions 
 2016: ZWINGER : new works : Lucid 2, art Karlsruhe
 2015: ZWINGER : recent, Art Fair Miami
 2006: STANDPUNKTE II 1986 bis 2006 – paintings, sculptures, graphics from the collection of the Museum Junge Kunst (Museum of Young Art) Frankfurt (Oder), Kunstraum Potsdam
 2004: all about… berlin  White Box Gallery, Munich, 2004

Works in public collections 

 Sammlungen Staatliche Schlösser und Museen (National Castles and Museums Collections), Schwerin 
 Collection Willy-Brandt-Haus, Berlin
 Collection Museum Junge Kunst, Frankfurt/Oder

Literature, catalogues, publications 
 Michael Freitag: Palmers Pausen, Malerei in Aspik, Gallery Werner Tammen, Berlin 2016 
 Palmers Pausen, In: Frankfurter Allgemeine Zeitung from August 25, 2016 (whole article behind paywall)
 Michael Freitag: Kabuff N.K.23, Gallery Werner Tammen, Berlin, 2006, 
 Michael Freitag: Bruch und Übergang (Rupture and Transition), Berlin, 2002
 Johannes Stettin: Die Stadt als Interieur,  Berlin, 1995
 "SMS an CDF", In: Frankfurter Allgemeine Zeitung from February 7, 2013 (whole article behind paywall)
 "Stromer, wo warst du?. In: Frankfurter Allgemeine Zeitung vom December 15, 2011 (whole article behind paywall)

Literature 
 "Der Maler Zwinger - Das wirklich Neue ist das nicht Erklärbare" Ingeborg Ruthe, January 18, 2007, article in Berliner Zeitung
 "Unterhalb der Romantikschwelle", Detlef Stapf, January 25, 2007, article in Norddeutsche Neuste Nachrichten
 "Zwinger zwingt's", Gerhard Charles Rump, January 13, 2007, article in DIE WELT
 "Der Nähe spröder Klang", Michaela Christen, September 1, 2006, article in Schweriner Volkszeitung

 "ZWINGER: Der verstellte Raum", NDR TV, Hamburg 2000

External links 

 
 
 official Website Thorsten Zwinger (German/English)

References 

German painters
People from Greifswald